Yeiler Andrés Goez (born 1 November 1999) is a Colombian football player who plays as midfielder for Independiente Santa Fe on loan from Atlético Nacional.

Career

Club career
In September 2020, Góez joined Argentine Primera División club Club Atlético Colón on loan from Atlético Nacional for the rest of the year, with an option to extend the deal until the end of 2021. Góez stayed at Colón until the end of 2021.

References

External links

1999 births
Living people
Colombian footballers
Colombian expatriate footballers
Colombia under-20 international footballers
Categoría Primera A players
Atlético Nacional footballers
Club Atlético Colón footballers
Independiente Santa Fe footballers
Association football midfielders
Footballers from Medellín
Colombian expatriate sportspeople in Argentina
Expatriate footballers in Argentina
21st-century Colombian people